Stephan Feuchtwang (born 1937) is emeritus professor of anthropology at the London School of Economics (LSE). His main area of research is China.

He was born in Berlin in 1937, the son of Wilhelm Feuchtwang and Eva Neurath. His grandfather, David Feuchtwang, was the chief rabbi of Vienna.

Feuchtwang is the author of books on Chinese popular religion, feng shui, and (with Wang Mingming) a book on local leadership: Grassroots Charisma in southern Fujian and northern Taiwan.

References

External links

 Interviewed by Alan Macfarlane 12 March 2009 (video)

1937 births
British anthropologists
German emigrants to England
Jewish emigrants from Nazi Germany to the United Kingdom
People from Berlin
Living people